The Greatest Wish in the World is a 1918 British silent romance film directed by Maurice Elvey and starring Bransby Williams, Mary Odette and Edward Combermere. It was adapted from a novel by E. Temple Thurston.

Cast
 Bransby Williams - Father O'Leary
 Mary Odette - Peggy
 Edward Combermere - Stephen Gale
 Ada King - Mrs. Parfitt
 Douglas Munro - Pinches
 Gwynne Herbert - Mrs. Gooseberry
 Jean Aylwin - Mother Superior
 Teddy Arundell
 Will Corrie

References

External links

1918 films
British silent feature films
1918 romantic comedy films
1910s English-language films
Films directed by Maurice Elvey
Films based on Irish novels
British romantic comedy films
British black-and-white films
1910s British films
Silent romantic comedy films